List of Frontline episodes may refer to: 

 List of Frontline (Australian TV series) episodes, an episode list for the 1994–1997 Australian television series which aired on ABC
 List of Frontline (U.S. TV program) episodes, an episode list for the U.S. television program which has aired on PBS since 1983